Richard Cann McMullen (January 2, 1868 – February 18, 1944) was an American manufacturer and politician from Wilmington, in New Castle County, Delaware. He was a member of the Democratic Party, who served as Governor of Delaware.

Early life and family
McMullen was born at Porters, near Glasgow, Delaware, son of James and Sarah Boulden McMullen. He worked as a farm hand to meet expenses while studying at Goldey Commercial College. He married Florence Hutchinson in 1895 and they had three children, Laura B., Richard H. and Florence and were members of the Methodist Church.

Professional and political career
McMullen learned the tanning and leather business while working at the Mullin and Pierson Leather Plant, later to become the Amalgamated Leather Company. In 1917 he and two partners founded the Standard Kid Company and later became vice president, then general manager of the Allied Kid Company in Wilmington. These companies were tanneries and leading manufactures of leather products.

As a prominent businessman he had served two terms on the Wilmington City Council, had served on the Public Utilities and Unemployment Insurance Commission, and had turned down an offer to run for Mayor of Wilmington.

Governor of Delaware
After reluctantly agreeing to run, he was elected Governor of Delaware in 1936, defeating Republican Harry L. Cannon, and Isaac D. Short, a Republican running as an Independent. McMullen was the first Democratic governor in 36 years and throughout his term was frustrated with his inability to replace his political opponents in state government. As his term was during the latter part of the Great Depression, public works projects were going on throughout the state, including the opening of the Roosevelt Inlet at Lewes, a new bridge over Indian River Inlet and a couple of new stations for the State Police.

{|class=wikitable style="width: 94%" style="text-align: center;" align="center"
|-bgcolor=#cccccc
!colspan=12 style="background: #ccccff;" |Delaware General Assembly   (sessions while Governor)
|-
!Year
!Assembly
!
!Senate Majority
!Presidentpro tempore
!
!House Majority
!Speaker
|-
|1937-1938
|109th
|
| |Republican
| |William A. Simonton
|
| |Democratic
| |John R. Fader
|-
|1939-1940
|110th
|
| |Republican
| |David W. Steele
|
| |Republican
| |Frank R. Zebley
|-

Death and legacy
McMullen was again nominated as the Democratic Party candidate for governor in 1940, but suffered a heart attack a month before the election and withdrew from the campaign. He died at Wilmington and is buried there in the Riverview Cemetery.

Almanac
Elections are held the first Tuesday after November 1. The governor takes office the third Tuesday of January and has a four-year term.

{|class=wikitable style="width: 94%" style="text-align: center;" align="center"
|-bgcolor=#cccccc
!colspan=7 style="background: #ccccff;" |Public offices
|-
! Office
! Type
! Location
! Began office
! Ended office
! notes 
|-
|Governor
|Executive
|Dover
|January 19, 1937
|January 21, 1941
|

{|class=wikitable style="width: 94%" style="text-align: center;" align="center"
|-bgcolor=#cccccc
!colspan=12 style="background: #ccccff;" |Election results
|-
!Year
!Office
!
!Subject
!Party
!Votes
!%
!
!Opponent
!Party
!Votes
!%
|-
|1936
|Governor
|
| |Richard C. McMullen
| |Democratic
| |65,437
| |51%
|
| |Harry L. CannonIsaac D. Short
| |RepublicanIndependent Republican
| |52,7828,400
| |42%7%

References

Images
Hall of Governors Portrait Gallery ; Portrait courtesy of Historical and Cultural Affairs, Dover.

External links
Biographical Directory of the Governors of the United States
Delaware’s Governors 

The Political Graveyard

Places with more information
Delaware Historical Society; website; 505 North Market Street, Wilmington, Delaware 19801; (302) 655-7161
University of Delaware; Library website; 181 South College Avenue, Newark, Delaware 19717; (302) 831-2965

1868 births
1965 deaths
Methodists from Delaware
Businesspeople from Wilmington, Delaware
Democratic Party governors of Delaware
Goldey–Beacom College alumni